The aircraft in this list include prototype versions of aircraft used by the German Luftwaffe during World War II and unfinished wartime experimental programmes. In the former, development can stretch back to the 1920s and in the latter the project must have started between 1939-1945.

Legitimacy of German projects
After the surrender of Nazi Germany several of the secret or unfinished projects of German military aircraft gained wide publicity. Also certain postwar planes such as the Bell X-5, F-86 Sabre or the MiG-15 were deemed to have been based on the pioneering work of World War II German aircraft designers. 
German aircraft manufacturers such as Henschel in Kassel had their archives destroyed in the course of the Allied bombing of the Third Reich at the end of World War II. Hence some of the late Henschel projects that were recreated later are based on documents found in other locations or on second-hand sources and not on the original Henschel technical drawings.

Arado 
(Arado Flugzeugwerke GmbH)
Arado Ar 198
Arado Ar 240
Arado Ar 532 - planned enlarged six-engine version of Ar 432
Arado Ar 560
Arado Ar 632 - planned enlarged six-engine version of Ar 432
Arado E.300
Arado E.310
Arado E.340 Medium bomber
Arado E.370
Arado E.371
Arado E.375
Arado E.377 Mistel glide bomb
Arado E.377a jet-powered version of Arado E.377
Arado E.380 Arado Ar 196 with folding wings
Arado E.381 I - Parasite fighter
Arado E.381 II - Parasite fighter
Arado E.381 III - Parasite fighter
Arado E.385
Arado E.390
Arado E.395 Swept wing jet bomber (Reference: German Air Projects vol. 3 1935-1945, Marek Rys)
Arado E.396
Arado E.401
Arado E.430
Arado E.432
Arado E.433
Arado E.440
Arado E.441
Arado E.470 Giant bomber (Reference: German Air Projects vol. 3 1935-1945, Marek Rys)
Arado E.480
Arado E.490
Arado E.500 - Heavy fighter
Arado E.530 - Bomber - zwilling' schnellbomber design
Arado E.532
Arado E.555 - proposed long range flying wing bomber work stopped at end of 1944.
Arado E.560 Swept wing jet bomber
Arado E.561 - Heavy fighter
Arado E.580 - Fighter
Arado E.581 - Flying wing fighter
Arado E.581-4
Arado E.581-5
Arado E.583
Arado E.625
Arado E.632
Arado E.651
Arado E.654 - Heavy fighter
Arado Projekt I - Night fighter
Arado Projekt II - Night/All-weather fighter 
Arado PTL-Strahlbomber - Swept wing turboprop bomber (Reference: German Air Projects vol. 3 1935-1945, Marek Rys)
Arado TEW 16/43-13
Arado TEW 16/43-15
Arado TEW 16/43-19
Arado TEW 16/43-23

 Bachem 
(Bachem-Werke GmbH)
 Bachem Ba 349 Natter
 Ba BP 20 - (Manned Flak Rocket) First versions of Ba 349, some Non-VTO fitted with fixed landing gear and solid nose for flight testing

 Blohm & Voss 
 Blohm & Voss Ha 139 - Seaplane transport 
 Blohm & Voss Ha 140 - Seaplane prototype
 Blohm & Voss BV 141 - Reconnaissance aircraft, previously designated as Ha 141
 Blohm & Voss Ha 142 - long-range maritime patrol/transport
 Blohm & Voss BV 143 - Glide bomb (prototype)
 Blohm & Voss BV 144 - Prototype passenger transport (1944)
 Blohm & Voss BV 155 - high-altitude interceptor developed from the Me 155 (1944)
 Blohm & Voss BV 237 - dive bomber, ground attack
 Blohm & Voss BV 238 - prototype flying boat
 Blohm & Voss BV 40  - Glider fighter 
 Blohm & Voss BV 138 - Flying boat 
 Blohm & Voss BV 246 - guided glide bomb
 Blohm & Voss BV 726 - jet powered version of P 200
 Blohm & Voss BV 950 - Air to surface anti shipping missile.
 Blohm & Voss L 10 - Low-speed variant of the BV 950
 Blohm & Voss L 11 - High-speed variant of the BV 950
 Blohm & Voss BV 250 Land version of BV 238 (Reference: German Air Projects vol. 3 1935-1945, Marek Rys)
 Blohm & Voss P 1 -  Single-seat fighter
 Blohm & Voss P 4 -  Single-seat trainer (Ha 136 development)
 Blohm & Voss P 5 -  General purpose
 Blohm & Voss P 6 -  Dive bomber (Ha 137 development)
 Blohm & Voss P 7 -  Biplane dive bomber
 Blohm & Voss P 8 -  Flying boat
 Blohm & Voss P 9 -  Flying boat (twin boom)
 Blohm & Voss P 10 -  General purpose
 Blohm & Voss P 11 -  Carrier based dive bomber (Ha 137 development)
 Blohm & Voss P 12 -  Flying boat
 Blohm & Voss P 13 -  Flying boat (twin hull)
 Blohm & Voss P 14 -  Reconnaissance flying boat
 Blohm & Voss P 15 -  Float Plane (Ha 139 development)
 Blohm & Voss P 16 -  Float Plane (Ha 139 development)
 Blohm & Voss P 17 -  Float Plane (Ha 139 development)
 Blohm & Voss P 18 -  Asymmetric fighter
 Blohm & Voss P 19 -  Reconnaissance (Ha 139 development)
 Blohm & Voss P 20 -  Bomber (Ha 139 development)
 Blohm & Voss P 21 -  General purpose
 Blohm & Voss P 22 -  Fighter
 Blohm & Voss P 23 -  P.22 development w/increased wing span
 Blohm & Voss P 24 -  Fighter/trainer for Japan
 Blohm & Voss P 25 -  Dive bomber
 Blohm & Voss P 27 -  Dive Bomber
 Blohm & Voss P 28 -  Rotating wing twin boom aircraft
 Blohm & Voss P 29 -  Passenger aircraft
 Blohm & Voss P 33 -  Long-range bomber
 Blohm & Voss P 37 -  Float Plane and torpedo fighter (Ha 139 development)
 Blohm & Voss P 38 -  Land version of Ha 139 w/increased wing span
 Blohm & Voss P 39 -  Bomber
 Blohm & Voss P 40 -  Asymmetric ground attacker aircraft
 Blohm & Voss P 41 -  Improved version of Ha 137
 Blohm & Voss P 42 -  Flying boat (twin boom)
 Blohm & Voss P 43 -  Flying boat
 Blohm & Voss P 44 -  Asymmetric reconnaissance aircraft
 Blohm & Voss P 45 -  Passenger transport w/rocket-assisted takeoff
 Blohm & Voss P 46 -  Ha 142 passenger aircraft development
 Blohm & Voss P 47 -  Passenger transport w/rocket-assisted takeoff
 Blohm & Voss P 48 -  Bomber version of Ha 142 for Japan
 Blohm & Voss P 49 -  Passenger float plane
 Blohm & Voss P 50 -  Freight float plane
 Blohm & Voss P 51 -  Freight float plane
 Blohm & Voss P 52 -  Passenger float plane
 Blohm & Voss P 53 -  Passenger float plane
 Blohm & Voss P 54 -  Passenger flying boat (BV 222 development)
 Blohm & Voss P 55 -  Improved version of Ha 140
 Blohm & Voss P 56 -  Seaplane dive bomber
 Blohm & Voss P 57 -  Flying boat
 Blohm & Voss P 58 -  Naval dive bomber
 Blohm & Voss P 59 -  Dive and torpedo bomber
 Blohm & Voss P 60 -  Flying boat
 Blohm & Voss P 61 -  Improved version of Ha 138
 Blohm & Voss P 62 -  Asymmetric dive bomber
 Blohm & Voss P 63 -  Fast bomber
 Blohm & Voss P 64 -  Long range aircraft
 Blohm & Voss P 65 -  Attack version of Ha 141
 Blohm & Voss P 66 -  Naval dive bomber
 Blohm & Voss P 67 -  Mine laying aircraft
 Blohm & Voss P 68 -  Mine layer version of BV 222
 Blohm & Voss P 69 -  Target drone
 Blohm & Voss P 70 -  Fast bomber
 Blohm & Voss P 71 -  Bomber/heavy fighter
 Blohm & Voss P 72 -  Attack version of Ha 141
 Blohm & Voss P 73 -  Bomber w/pusher propellers
 Blohm & Voss P 74 -  Multipurpose version of Ha 141
 Blohm & Voss P 75 -  Multipurpose version of Ha 141
 Blohm & Voss P 76 -  Long range reconnaissance version of BV 222
 Blohm & Voss P 77 -  Long range reconnaissance version of BV 222
 Blohm & Voss P 78 -  Long range floatplane
 Blohm & Voss P 79 -  Long range floatplane
 Blohm & Voss P 80 -  Transoceanic aircraft w/twin floats
 Blohm & Voss P 81 -  Long range aircraft
 Blohm & Voss P 83 -  Trans-atlantic aircraft
 Blohm & Voss P 84 -  Long range aircraft
 Blohm & Voss P 85 -  Trans-atlantic aircraft
 Blohm & Voss P 86 -  Trans-atlantic aircraft
 Blohm & Voss P 88 -  Long range heavy fighter
 Blohm & Voss P 89 -  Long range heavy fighter
 Blohm & Voss P 90 -  Long range heavy fighter
 Blohm & Voss P 92 -  Passenger aircraft
 Blohm & Voss P 94 -  Improved BV 138
 Blohm & Voss P 95 -  BV 222 development
 Blohm & Voss P 96 -  BV 222 development
 Blohm & Voss P 97 -  BV 222 development
 Blohm & Voss P 98 -  BV 222 development
 Blohm & Voss P 99 -  BV 222 development
 Blohm & Voss P 100 -  Target drone
 Blohm & Voss P 101 -  Target drone
 Blohm & Voss P 103 -  Asymmetric airliner
 Blohm & Voss P 104 -  Airliner w/tail-mounted propeller
 Blohm & Voss P 105 -  BV 222 development
 Blohm & Voss P 106 -  BV 222 development
 Blohm & Voss P 107 -  BV 222 development
 Blohm & Voss P 108 -  BV 138 development
 Blohm & Voss P 109 -  BV 138 development
 Blohm & Voss P 110 -  BV 138 development
 Blohm & Voss P 111 -  Asymmetric BV 138 development
 Blohm & Voss P 112 -  Asymmetric BV 138 development
 Blohm & Voss P 113 -  Asymmetric seaplane
 Blohm & Voss P 114 -  BV 141 heavy fighter version
 Blohm & Voss P 116 -  BV 222 development
 Blohm & Voss P 117 -  BV 222 development
 Blohm & Voss P 118 -  BV 222 development
 Blohm & Voss P 119 -  BV 222 development
 Blohm & Voss P 122 -  Maritime patrol floatplane
 Blohm & Voss P 123 -  Twin hull patrol flying boat
 Blohm & Voss P 124 -  Maritime patrol flying boat
 Blohm & Voss P 125 -  Maritime patrol floatplane
 Blohm & Voss P 127 -  Single-seat fighter
 Blohm & Voss P 128 -  Asymmetric single-seat fighter
 Blohm & Voss P 129 -  Fighter
 Blohm & Voss P 131 -  Airliner w/tail-mounted propeller
 Blohm & Voss P 134 -  Fast bomber w/pusher propeller
 Blohm & Voss P 135 -  Asymmetric fast bomber
 Blohm & Voss P 138 -  Long range reconnaissance flying boat
 Blohm & Voss P 139 -  Flying boat
 Blohm & Voss P 140 -  Passenger aircraft
 Blohm & Voss P 141 -  Asymmetric passenger aircraft
 Blohm & Voss P 142 -  Passenger aircraft w/rotating wing
 Blohm & Voss P 143 -  Passenger aircraft w/rotating wing
 Blohm & Voss P 144 -  Maritime patrol aircraft
 Blohm & Voss P 145 -  Maritime twin float patrol aircraft
 Blohm & Voss P 146 -  P.144 development for DLH
 Blohm & Voss P 147 -  P.142 development for transport
 Blohm & Voss P 148 -  Flying boat
 Blohm & Voss P 149 -  Flying boat
 Blohm & Voss P 150 -  Trans-atlantic flying boat w/pressurized cabin
 Blohm & Voss P 155 -  Asymmetric dive bomber
 Blohm & Voss P 160 -  Trans-atlantic flying boat
 Blohm & Voss P 161 -  Land version of BV 238
 Blohm & Voss P 162 -  Bomber
 Blohm & Voss P 163 -  Bomber/heavy fighter
 Blohm & Voss P 164 -  Asymmetric fast bomber
 Blohm & Voss P 165 -  Asymmetric fast bomber
 Blohm & Voss P 166 -  Fast bomber
 Blohm & Voss P 167 -  Twin BV 250 land version
 Blohm & Voss P 168 -  Asymmetric fighter/bomber
 Blohm & Voss P 170 -  Fast bomber
 Blohm & Voss P 171 -  Fast bomber
 Blohm & Voss P 172 -  Dive bomber
 Blohm & Voss P 173 -  Long-range bomber
 Blohm & Voss P 174 -  Glider bomb
 Blohm & Voss P 175 -  Parasite fighter
 Blohm & Voss P 176 -  BV 237 armored version
 Blohm & Voss P 177 -  Asymmetric jet fighter/bomber
 Blohm & Voss P 178 -  Asymmetric jet fighter/bomber
 Blohm & Voss P 179 -  Asymmetric fighter/bomber
 Blohm & Voss P 180 -  Fighter/bomber w/rotating wing
 Blohm & Voss P 181 -  Fighter/bomber
 Blohm & Voss P 182 -  Fighter/bomber
 Blohm & Voss P 183 -  Long range patrol aircraft
 Blohm & Voss P 184 -  Long range patrol aircraft
 Blohm & Voss P 184.01
 Blohm & Voss P 185 -  Ground attack aircraft
 Blohm & Voss P 186 -  Glider fighter
 Blohm & Voss P 187 -  Land version of BV 222
 Blohm & Voss P 188 -  Jet bomber w/compound swept wing
 Blohm & Voss P 190 -  Single seat jet fighter
 Blohm & Voss P 191 -  Flak suppression aircraft
 Blohm & Voss P 192 -  Ground attack aircraft
 Blohm & Voss P 193 -  Ground attack aircraft w/pusher propeller and variable-incidence wing
 Blohm & Voss P 194 -  Asymmetric mixed propulsion ground attacker aircraft
 Blohm & Voss P 195 -  High altitude fighter w/ turbo supercharger
 Blohm & Voss P 196 -  Twin boom jet ground attack aircraft
 Blohm & Voss P 197 -  Single seat jet fighter
 Blohm & Voss P 198 -  High altitude jet fighter
 Blohm & Voss P 199 -  High altitude jet fighter
 Blohm & Voss P 200 -  Transatlantic passenger flying boat project developed from the BV 222
 Blohm & Voss P 201 -  High altitude rocket powered interceptor
 Blohm & Voss P 202 -  Slewed wing jet fighter
 Blohm & Voss P 203 -  Night/heavy fighter w/ mixed propulsion
 Blohm & Voss P 204 -  Asymmetric ground attack aircraft w/ mixed propulsion
 Blohm & Voss P 205 -  BV 155 development
 Blohm & Voss P 206 -  Long-range bomber
 Blohm & Voss P 207.02 -  Fighter w/ pusher propeller
 Blohm & Voss P 207.03 -  Fighter w/ pusher propeller
 Blohm & Voss P 208 -  Tailless fighter w/pusher propeller
 Blohm & Voss P 209.01 -  Tailless jet fighter
 Blohm & Voss P 209.02 -  Single seat forward swept wing jet fighter
 Blohm & Voss P 210 -  Tailless jet fighter, Volksjäger design candidate
 Blohm & Voss P 211.01 -  Swept wing jet fighter
 Blohm & Voss P 211.02 -  1944 Volksjäger project submission
 Blohm & Voss P 212 -  Tailless jet fighter, Emergency Fighter Program design candidate
 Blohm & Voss P 213 -  Pulse jet miniature fighter, Miniaturjäger design candidate
 Blohm & Voss P 214 -  Piloted tailless flying bomb
 Blohm & Voss P 215 -  Tailless, swept-wing jet night fighter
 Blohm & Voss Ae 607 - Jet-engined flying wing fighterDan Sharp; "Bats From Hamburg", Luftwaffe: Secret Wings of the Third Reich, Mortons, 2017, pp.68-73.

 BMW 
(Bayerische Motoren-Werke GmbH)
BMW Strahlbomber I Swept wing tailless jet bomber (Reference: German Air Projects vol. 3 1935-1945, Marek Rys)
BMW Strahlbomber II Swept wing tailless jet bomber (Reference: German Air Projects vol. 3 1935-1945, Marek Rys)
BMW Schnellbomber I Swept wing turboprop bomber (Reference: German Air Projects vol. 3 1935-1945, Marek Rys)
BMW Schnellbomber II forward swept wing turboprop bomber (Reference: German Air Projects vol. 3 1935-1945, Marek Rys)
BMW Strahljäger I
BMW Strahljäger II
BMW Strahljäger III
BMW Strahljäger IV
BMW P.8011

Daimler-Benz
(Daimler-Benz)
 Daimler-Benz Projekt A - Giant carrier aircraft with underslung twin-engined jet bomber with V-tail, project
 Daimler-Benz Projekt B - Giant carrier aircraft with underslung single engine jet bomber, project
 Daimler-Benz Projekt C - Giant carrier aircraft designed for launching missiles
 Daimler-Benz Projekt D - Giant carrier aircraft of different configuration with underslung Projekt B bomber
 Daimler-Benz Projekt E - Giant carrier aircraft designed to carry 6 piloted Projekt F missiles
 Daimler-Benz Projekt F - parasite manned missile carried by Projekt E carrier. Possible suicide craft as escape downwards near target nearly impossible at speed.
Daimler Benz JÄGER

 Dornier 
(Dornier Werke GmbH)
 Dornier Do 10 Test-bed fighter
 Dornier Do 13
 Dornier Do 19 four-engine heavy bomber, Ural bomber design candidate
 Dornier Do 29 proposed heavy fighter
 Dornier Do 214 Transport flying boat (project)
 Dornier Do 216
 Dornier Do 317 medium bomber, Bomber B candidate
 Dornier Do 335Z
 Dornier Do 435
 Dornier Do 535
 Dornier Do 635 (Junkers Ju 635) development of Dornier Do 335 project; also known as Do 335Z
 Dornier P.59
 Dornier P.174
 Dornier P.192
 Dornier P.231
 Dornier P.232
 Dornier P.238
 Dornier P.247
 Dornier P.252
 Dornier P.254
 Dornier P.256
 Dornier P.273

DFS
(Deutsche Forschungsanstalt für Segelflug)
DFS 39 Lippisch-designed tailless research aircraft
DFS 40 Lippisch-designed tail-less research aircraft
DFS 194 Rocket-powered research aircraft, forerunner of Me 163
DFS 228 Rocket-powered reconnaissance aircraft (2 prototypes)
DFS 332
DFS 346 Supersonic research aircraft (incomplete prototype only)
DFS Eber Ramming interceptor

 Fieseler
(Gerhard Fieseler Werke GmbH)
 Fieseler Fi 157 unmanned anti-aircraft target drone
 Fieseler Fi 166 vertical-launched jet fighter
 Fieseler Fi 168 projected ground attack aircraft
 Fieseler Fi 333 prototype transport aircraft
 Fieseler Fi 356

 Flettner 
(Flettner Flugzeugbau GmbH  / Anton Flettner G.m.b.H.)
Flettner Fl 184 night reconnaissance/ASW autogyro
Flettner Fl 185 gyrodyne
Flettner Fl 265 experimental helicopter
Flettner Fl 339 Reconnaissance helicopter

 Focke-Achgelis 
(Focke-Achgelis & Co. GmbH)
Focke-Achgelis Fa 224 paper-only sports version of Focke-Wulf Fw 61
Focke-Achgelis Fa 225 rotary wing assault glider prototype
Focke-Achgelis Fa 269 tiltrotor VTOL aircraft 
Focke-Achgelis Fa 283
Focke-Achgelis Fa 284 proposed heavy transport helicopter
Focke-Achgelis Fa 325 Krabbe paper-only rotary wing transport
Focke-Achgelis Fa 336 proposed powered version of Fa 330

 Focke-Wulf 
(Focke-Wulf Flugzeugbau GmbH)
 Focke Rochen
 Focke-Wulf Fw 42 twin-engine medium bomber developed from the F 19
 Focke-Wulf Fw 57 heavy fighter-bomber prototype
 Focke-Wulf Ta 153
 Focke-Wulf Ta 154 Moskito night fighter prototype
 Focke-Wulf Ta 183 Huckebein (Entwurf V) - "Third-generation" jet fighter
 Focke-Wulf Fw 188 prototype reconnaissance aircraft
 Focke-Wulf Fw 191 Bomber B medium bomber program entry
 Focke-Wulf Fw 206 - planned twin-engine airliner
 Focke-Wulf Fw 238 long-range bomber (project)
 Focke-Wulf Fw 249 large transport aircraft (project); officially designated as Project 195
 Focke-Wulf Ta 254 proposed development of Ta 154
 Focke-Wulf Fw 300 proposed long-range airliner/transport/reconnaissance/ASW aircraft; a replacement for the Focke-Wulf Fw 200 Condor airliner
 Focke-Wulf Ta 400 six-engine, trans-Atlantic range Amerikabomber design competitor
 Focke-Wulf Fw 491 (Fw 391 development) (project)
 Focke-Wulf Strahlrohrjäger Ramjet-powered fighter, also known as "Ta 282"
 Focke-Wulf Mittelhuber (Entwurf III, incorrectly called "Fw 252")
 Focke-Wulf 1000x1000x1000 - series of bomber designs; also known as Fw 239
 Focke-Wulf Fighter Project 000-222-018
 Focke-Wulf Fighter Project with BMW 803 - fighter with connected twin-boom tail, slightly swept wings and pusher propellers (1941)
 Focke-Wulf Fighter Project with 2 BMW 801F
 Focke-Wulf Fighter Project 603s-001
 Focke-Wulf Project I (Entwurf I) - jet fighter design study
 Focke-Wulf Project II (Entwurf II, Nr. 264) - jet fighter design study
 Focke-Wulf Project III (Entwurf III) - jet fighter design study
 Focke-Wulf Project IV (Entwurf IV)
 Focke-Wulf Project VI Flitzer (Entwurf VI, Nr. 280)
 Focke-Wulf Project VII Peterle Focke-Wulf Project VIII Einmotoriges Jagdflugzeug mit PTL-Gerät 021 (Nr.281, erroneously called "Fw 281" in several sources)
 Focke-Wulf Night Fighter Project 011-45
 Focke-Wulf Night Fighter Project 011-46
 Focke-Wulf Night Fighter Project 011-47
 Focke-Wulf Night Fighter P.03.10251.13
 Focke-Wulf Project 82114
 Focke-Wulf P.03.1022 (Nr. 261, erroneously called "Fw 261" in several sources)
 Focke-Wulf P.03.10221.15 - large capacity strategic transport
 Focke-Wulf P.03.10224.20/21
 Focke-Wulf P.03.10224.30
 Focke-Wulf P.03.10025 - swept-wing, V-tailed fighter with pusher propellers (1944)
 Focke-Wulf P.03.10226.126
 Focke-Wulf P.03.10226.127
 Focke-Wulf P.03.10251 - series of night and all-weather jet fighters
 Focke-Wulf P.03.10252.102 (erroneously called "Fw 250" in some sources)
 Focke-Wulf Project Super-TL
 Focke-Wulf Super-Lorin
 Focke-Wulf Triebflügel
 Focke-Wulf Volksjäger 1
 Focke-Wulf Volksjäger 2
 Focke-Wulf Volksflugzeug

Gotha
( Gothaer Waggonfabrik)
 Gotha Projekt P 35
 Gotha Projekt P 39
 Gotha Projekt P 40B
 Gotha Projekt P 45
 Gotha Projekt P 46
 Gotha Projekt P 47
 Gotha Projekt P 50/I
 Gotha Projekt P 50/II
 Gotha Projekt P 52
 Gotha Projekt P 53
 Gotha Projekt P 56
 Gotha Projekt P 58
 Gotha Projekt P 60
 Gotha Projekt P 3001
 Gotha Projekt P 3002
 Gotha Projekt P 8001
 Gotha Projekt P 9001
 Gotha Projekt P 9007
 Gotha Projekt P 10003
 Gotha Projekt P 11001
 Gotha Projekt P 12001
 Gotha Projekt P 14002
 Gotha Projekt P 14012
 Gotha Projekt P 16001
 Gotha Projekt P 17002
 Gotha Projekt P 20001
 Gotha Projekt P 21005
 Gotha Projekt P 35001

 Heinkel 
(Ernst Heinkel A.G.)
Heinkel He 119 Experimental reconnaissance bomber
Heinkel He 176 Rocket-powered experimental aircraft (prototype), First manned liquid-fueled rocket aircraft to fly
Heinkel He 177B first proposal for a four-engined version of the He 177A, three prototypes completed, at least two flown.
Heinkel He 178 Jet-powered experimental aircraft, world's first turbojet-powered aircraft to fly (August 1939) 
Heinkel He 274 Four-engine high-altitude heavy bomber development of the He 177, two prototypes (of six ordered)  completed by the French after war.
Heinkel He 277 Paper-only four-engine Amerikabomber bomber development of the He 177, designated by February 1943, cancelled April 1944
Heinkel He 280 First jet fighter.
Heinkel P.1064
Heinkel P.1065
Heinkel P.1066
Heinkel P.1068 - project number from DFS for Heinkel He 343 jet bomber
Heinkel P.1055.01
Heinkel P.1069
Heinkel P.1070
Heinkel P.1071
Heinkel P.1072
Heinkel P.1073.01
Heinkel P.1073.02
Heinkel P.1073.03
Heinkel P.1073.04
Heinkel P.1074
Heinkel P.1075 (Do 535)
Heinkel P.1076 single-engine high-speed fighter
Heinkel P.1077 Julia projected single-seat interceptor, Emergency Fighter Program design candidate
Heinkel P.1078 projected single-seat interceptor, Emergency Fighter Program design candidate
Heinkel P.1079 paper-only all-weather jet fighter
Heinkel P.1080 paper-only ramjet fighter
Heinkel Wespe paper-only VTOL interceptor aircraft
Heinkel Lerche paper-only annular-wing VTOL fighter/ground attack aircraft
Heinkel Strabo 16

 Henschel 
(Henschel Flugzeugwerke A.G.)
 Henschel Hs 127 bomber prototype
 Henschel Hs 130 high-altitude reconnaissance/bomber prototype
 Henschel Hs 132 jet-powered dive bomber
 Henschel Projekt P.54
 Henschel Projekt P.72
 Henschel Projekt P.75 canard-wing fighter
 Henschel Projekt P.76
 Henschel Projekt P.80
 Henschel Projekt P.87 canard-wing bomber
 Henschel Projekt P.122 tailless jet bomber
 Henschel Projekt P.135 tailless, compound swept wing jet bomber
 Henschel Projekt P.J. 600/67
 Henschel Projekt P. Transporter

 Horten 
Horten Ho 229 Experimental flying wing jet fighter-bomber prototype
Horten H.XVIII proposed long-range flying wing jet bomber, Amerikabomber design candidate (Reference: German Air Projects vol. 3 1935-1945, Marek Rys)

 Hütter
(Ulrich Hütter and Wolfgang Hütter)
 Hütter Hü 136 Experimental dive bomber

 Junkers 
(Junkers Flugzeug-Werke A.G.)
Junkers Ju 85
Junkers Ju 89 heavy bomber prototype, Ural bomber design candidate
Junkers Ju 186 proposed four-engine high-altitude bomber
Junkers Ju 187 projected dive bomber
Junkers Ju 268 unmanned parasite fighter
Junkers Ju 286 proposed six-engine high-altitude bomber
Junkers Ju 287 Heavy bomber (jet-engined) (prototype)
Junkers Ju 288 Bomber B program favored contender (prototype)
Junkers Ju 290 Long-range bomber (prototype)
Junkers Ju 322 Mammut transport glider (prototype), 1941
Junkers Ju 390 six engined Amerikabomber design competitor, derivative of the Ju 290 (two airworthy prototypes) 
Junkers Ju 488 proposed four-engine strategic bomber
Junkers EF 008 (Entwicklung Flugzeug)
Junkers EF 009 Hubjäger (German: "lift-fighter")
Junkers EF 010 High speed jet aircraft designed for record breaking speed
Junkers EF 011 Hubjäger (German: "lift-fighter")
Junkers EF 012
Junkers EF 015
Junkers EF 017 design designation for J 32/A 32
Junkers EF 018
Junkers EF 019
Junkers EF 043
Junkers EF 050 VTOL design study
Junkers EF 061 pressurized high-altitude bomber prototype
Junkers EF 072 early design for EF 077
Junkers EF 073 Medium bomber developed into Ju 288
Junkers EF 074 design designation of Ju 288
Junkers EF 077 Airliner project developed into Ju 252
Junkers EF 094 design designation of Ju 322
Junkers EF 100 long-range reconnaissance/bomber developed from the EF 53
Junkers EF 101 Mistel carrier design
Junkers EF 112 twin-boom ground attack aircraft
Junkers EF 115 projected bomber 
Junkers EF 116 projected W-wing jet bomber
Junkers EF 122 four-engine development of Ju 287
Junkers EF 125 two-engine development of Ju 287, precursor of EF 140
Junkers EF 126 Lilli experimental pulsejet fighter, Miniaturjägerprogramm design candidate
Junkers EF 127 Walli rocket-powered fighter, Emergency Fighter Program design candidate
Junkers EF 128 tailless, swept-wing jet interceptor, Emergency Fighter Program design candidate
Junkers EF 130 projected flying-wing bomber
Junkers EF 131 six-engine development of Ju 287, completed postwar in the Soviet Union
Junkers EF 132 planned jet bomber
Junkers EF 135 EF 130 development
Junkers EF 140 jet reconnaissance/bomber, completed postwar in the Soviet Union
Junkers EF 150 jet bomber, Russian designed and completed postwar in the Soviet Union
Junkers EF with BMW 801
Junkers EF 2x Jumo 004
Junkers project GAA

Lippisch
 Lippisch Li 163S
 Lippisch P.01-111
 Lippisch P.01-119
 Lippisch P.03
 Lippisch P.04-107a
 Lippisch P.04-106
 Lippisch P.04-114
 Lippisch P.05
 Lippisch P.06
 Lippisch P.08
 Lippisch P.09
 Lippisch P.10
 Lippisch P.11 - proposed twinjet delta flying wing
 Lippisch P.12
 Lippisch P.13
 Lippisch P.13a - ramjet-powered interceptor
 Lippisch P.13b
 Lippisch P.14
 Lippisch P.15 - proposed turbojet fighter
 Lippisch P.20 - Me 163 development

Messerschmitt
 Messerschmitt Bf 109TL jet fighter; intended as a stopgap if the Me 262 did not enter production
 Messerschmitt Bf 109Z two Bf 109F airframes joined together; developed in interceptor and fighter-bomber versions
 Messerschmitt Me 163 Komet first rocket-engined interceptor
 Messerschmitt Me 209 - Fighter (prototype); not related to the earlier Me 209 air speed record aircraft
 Messerschmitt Me 261 Adolfine - Long-range reconnaissance aircraft
 Messerschmitt Me 262 first jet fighter aircraft
 Messerschmitt Me 263 Scholle - interceptor (rocket-engined), also bore Junkers Ju 248 designation
 Messerschmitt Me 264 long-range strategic bomber, first-built Amerikabomber design competitor (3 airworthy prototypes) 
 Messerschmitt Me 265 flying-wing heavy fighter design project; also known as Lippisch P.10
 Messerschmitt Me 309 Tricycle undercarriage-equipped piston engined fighter (prototype)
 Messerschmitt Me 609 - heavy fighter (project), two Me 309 fuselages joined together; also known as Me 309Z
 Messerschmitt Me 329 - flying-wing heavy fighter/ground-attack design project
 Messerschmitt Me 334 - proposed tailless fighter with pusher propeller
 Messerschmitt Me 364 - six-engine version of Me 264; also known as Me 264/6m
 Messerschmitt Me 509 - all-metal fighter project
 Messerschmitt P.08.01
 Messerschmitt P.1070
 Messerschmitt P.1073
 Messerschmitt P.1075
 Messerschmitt P.1079 - series of pulsejet and ramjet-powered fighters
 Messerschmitt P.1085
 Messerschmitt P.1090
 Messerschmitt P.1092 - series of experimental aircraft
 Messerschmitt P.1092C
 Messerschmitt P.1095
 Messerschmitt P.1099 - prototype multirole jet fighter
 Messerschmitt P.1100/A
 Messerschmitt P.1100/B
 Messerschmitt P.1100/I
 Messerschmitt P.1100/II
 Messerschmitt P.1101 - variable-sweep jet fighter
 Messerschmitt P.1101/92 75mm BK 7.5 mounted jet bomber destroyer
 Messerschmitt P.1101/99 55mm MK 114 mounted jet bomber destroyer
 Messerschmitt P.1101/XVIII-101
 Messerschmitt P.1101/XVIII-108
 Messerschmitt P.1102
 Messerschmitt P.1102/105
 Messerschmitt P.1102B
 Messerschmitt P.1103 and P.1104 - series of rocket-powered interceptors
 Messerschmitt P.1106 - proposed jet fighter
 Messerschmitt P.1107 (IX-122) - tailless variant of P.1107 with larger wing and redesigned landing gear; would have been given the Me 462 designation
 Messerschmitt P.1107/I - jet bomber project
 Messerschmitt P.1107/II - improved P.1107/I
 Messerschmitt P.1108 - jet bomber design project
 Messerschmitt P.1110 - high-altitude interceptor design project
 Messerschmitt P.1111 - jet fighter/interceptor design project
 Messerschmitt P.1112 - proposed jet fighter

Sack
Sack AS-6

Schempp-Hirth
Göppingen Gö 8
Göppingen Gö 9 Development aircraft for Do 335 PfeilŠkoda-Kauba
Škoda-Kauba SK 257 fighter trainer.
Škoda-Kauba SK P14 ramjet powered interceptor.

 Sombold 
 Sombold So 344 Schußjäger Stöckel 
 Stöckel Rammschussjäger (Ramshot Fighter) ramjet-rocket annular explosive warhead launcher aircraft project, 1944

Weser
 Weserflug Bf 163
 Weserflug P.1003 - tilt-rotor aircraft project
 Weserflug P.2127 - twin-boom aircraft project
 Weserflug P.2130
 Weserflug P.2131
 Weserflug P.2136
 Weserflug P.2137
 Weserflug P.2138 - large flying boat project
 Weserflug P.2146
 Weserflug P.2147

Zeppelin
Fliegende Panzerfaust
Zeppelin Rammer

See also
List of military aircraft of Germany 
List of military aircraft of Germany by manufacturer
RLM aircraft designation system
List of military aircraft of Germany during World War II

References
Notes

Bibliography
Rys, Marek German Air Projects 1935-1945 vol.3 (Bombers). Mushroom model publications. 2007. 
Witkowski, Ryszard "Rotorcraft of the Third Reich". Mushroom Model. 2007. Redbourn, UK. 
Nowarra, Heinz J.. Die Deutsche Luftruestung 1933-1945 - Vol.1 - Flugzeugtypen  AEG-Dornier. Bernard & Graefe Verlag. 1993. Koblenz.  (Gesamtwek),  (Band 1)
Nowarra, Heinz J.. Die Deutsche Luftruestung 1933-1945 - Vol.2 - Flugzeugtypen Erla-Heinkel.  Bernard & Graefe Verlag. 1993. Koblenz.  (Gesamtwek),  (Band 2)
Nowarra, Heinz J.. Die Deutsche Luftruestung 1933-1945 - Vol.3 - Flugzeugtypen Henschel-Messerschmitt. Bernard & Graefe Verlag. 1993. Koblenz.  (Gesamtwek),  (Band 3)
Nowarra, Heinz J.. Die Deutsche Luftruestung 1933-1945 Vol.4 – Flugzeugtypen MIAG-Zeppelin''. Bernard & Graefe Verlag. 1993. Koblenz.  (Gesamtwek),  (Band 4)

External links
World War II German aircraft projects
German aircraft projects (in Russian)

World War II experimental aircraft of Germany
Aircraft projects
Aircraft projects, 1939-45
 
Proposed World War II military aircraft of Germany
Abandoned military aircraft projects of Germany
World
Germany
proposed
Germany p